German submarine U-859 was a Type IXD2 U-boat built for Nazi Germany's Kriegsmarine during World War II. She was one of a select number of U-boats to join Monsun Gruppe or Monsoon Group, which operated in the Far East alongside the Imperial Japanese Navy.

Construction
U-859 was built in Bremen during 1942 and 1943, and was heavily adapted following her completion in July 1943, with the addition of a snorkel to enable her to stay underwater for longer during the hazardous passage to Penang in Malaya. Thus she was not ready for war service until the spring of 1944, when following her working up period and modifications she departed Kiel for the East.

Design
German Type IXD2 submarines were considerably larger than the original Type IXs. U-859 had a displacement of  when at the surface and  while submerged. She had two shafts and two  propellers.

U-859 was fitted with six  torpedo tubes (four fitted at the bow and two at the stern), 24 torpedoes, one  SK C/32 naval gun, 150 rounds, and a  Flak M42 with 2575 rounds as well as two  C/30 anti-aircraft guns with 8100 rounds. The boat had a complement of fifty-five.

Service history
Although U-859 only had a single war patrol from which she never returned, her six month career was highly eventful and carried her halfway across the world and into an entirely different theatre of conflict.

Commanded by Kapitänleutnant Johann Jebsen, U-859 sailed from Kiel for Penang on 4 April 1944, carrying 31 tons of mercury in metal flasks destined for use in the Japanese munitions industry. She avoided shipping lanes and during her time in the North Atlantic, remained submerged for 23 hours every day, running on her schnorkel, surfacing for just one hour per day at 23:00, later reduced to 15 minutes.

Colin
Three weeks into her voyage, Jebsen saw a target he could not refuse. The Colin, formerly an Italian freighter taken over by American authorities and registered in Panama, was slowly steaming unescorted in the North Atlantic following engine failure. Three torpedoes sank her before U-859 went on her way southwards.

The boat's voyage continued smoothly for the next two months, and she rounded the Cape of Good Hope and entered the Indian Ocean without further trouble. On 5 July she was spotted by a Lockheed Ventura aircraft, which swooped down on the boat only to be brought down by the anti-aircraft guns. There were no survivors from the aircraft's crew. One rating of U-859 was killed and one officer seriously injured. (Other sources say the attacking plane was a Catalina anti-submarine-plane).

John Barry
Her second victim was her most famous, and became one of the most famous treasure shipwrecks of the Twentieth Century. A massive salvage operation in 1994 succeeded in retrieving many of the lost coins.

Troilus
Three days later another unescorted merchantman, the British Troilus was also sunk, with six hands drowned.

Fate
On 23 September 1944 U-859 was running on the surface, within  of Penang and the end of her voyage, when she was intercepted in the Malacca Straits by the British submarine , which had been forewarned of her arrival date and route by decrypted German signals. In difficult conditions with a heavy swell running and a second U-boat thought to be lurking, Trenchants commander Arthur Hezlet carried out a snap attack using his stern torpedo tubes, hitting U-859 amidships.

Twenty of the crew did manage to escape however, opening the hatch in the relatively shallow sea and struggling to the calm surface. Eleven of the survivors were picked up by HMS Trenchant immediately following the sinking, and the remaining nine were picked up by the Japanese after being adrift for 24 hours and were taken ashore to await repatriation.

Salvage
In 1972 a total of 12 tons of mercury were recovered from U-859 and brought into Singapore. The West German Embassy claimed ownership of the mercury. The Receiver of Wreck took possession of the mercury, and the High Court of Singapore ruled that "the German state has never ceased to exist despite Germany's unconditional surrender in 1945 and whatever was the property of the German State, unless it was captured and taken away by one of the Allied Powers, still remains the property of the German State..."

Summary of raiding history

References

Bibliography

External links
 

World War II submarines of Germany
German Type IX submarines
U-boats sunk by British submarines
U-boats commissioned in 1943
U-boats sunk in 1944
Indian Ocean U-Boats
1943 ships
World War II shipwrecks in the Strait of Malacca
Ships built in Bremen (state)
Maritime incidents in September 1944